GlobalGiving is 501(c)(3) non-profit organization based in the United States that provides a global crowdfunding platform for grassroots charitable projects. Since 2002, more than 1.6 million donors on GlobalGiving have donated more than $750 million to support more than 33,000 projects in 175 countries.

History
Before founding GlobalGiving, Mari Kuraishi and Dennis Whittle were heads of strategy and innovation at the World Bank. While in that post, they created the first-ever Innovation Marketplace for Bank staff in 1998, an internal competition in which Bank employees pitched their own ideas for fighting poverty worldwide. The winners received grants to develop their ideas.

In 2000, they took the concept and competition to the outside world. The Development Marketplace enabled any social entrepreneur to compete for Bank funds. The program was extremely successful — finalists from all over the world gathered in Washington, D.C., and $5 million was awarded to the 44 most innovative projects.

Based on the Marketplaces' success, Mari and Dennis created an Internet-based platform to facilitate a broader range of social and economic investments in developing countries. In October 2000, they left the World Bank and on February 14, 2002, GlobalGiving (formerly DevelopmentSpace) was launched.

Major funding for the launch and early stages was provided by the Omidyar Network, the Skoll Foundation, the William and Flora Hewlett Foundation, and the Sall Foundation. GlobalGiving was launched as a collaboration between the GlobalGiving Foundation and ManyFutures, Inc. In December 2008, ManyFutures became a formal subsidiary of the GlobalGiving Foundation, and all operations were placed under direct foundation management.

Victoria Vrana, a longtime senior leader at the Gates Foundation, is slated to become CEO in January 2023.  Donna Callejon, who has held multiple leadership positions in the organization since 2003, was appointed Interim CEO in December 2021, succeeding Alix Guerrier, who was appointed CEO in 2018. Mari Kuraishi stepped down as President on November 1, 2018 and joined her co-founder and former CEO, Dennis Whittle, on the organization’s Board of Directors.

Structure
The GlobalGiving Foundation is a US-based non-profit organization that individuals and companies can donate to through the website globalgiving.org. It is supported by a network of implementing, corporate and institutional partners.

Potential donors can browse and select from a wide offering of projects that are organized by geography or by themes such as health care, the environment and education. A donor can contribute any amount using a credit/debit card, check, PayPal, Apple Pay, stock transfer, DAF, or M-Pesa. Donors can purchase gift cards which recipients can redeem in support of a project of their choosing.

GlobalGiving funds itself by retaining a 5-12% nonprofit support fee plus a 3% third-party processing fee for each donation. The nonprofit support fee covers the cost of providing support and training to nonprofits, conducting rigorous due diligence on organizations, and conducting field visits. GlobalGiving's administrative overhead is 3.0%.

Companies can also use the GlobalGiving platform to allow their employees, customers, partners, or foundation entities to donate directly to grassroots social and economic development projects around the world.

GlobalGiving as a web-based fundraising platform is fundamentally different from the World Bank Development Marketplace because it is based on social networks and real-time feedback between donors and grassroots social entrepreneurs or "project leaders." Each organization pitches one or more development projects to prospective donors on the website. The funding decision for each project is crowd-sourced to the public, rather than determined by a team of experts, as in the Development Marketplace. However, in practice, organizations that promote themselves through email and social media campaigns vastly improve their fundraising potential. Each project depends on evangelists (people who spread good news) to flourish. The funding and project update history for each project is public and acts as a form of reputation system for the organization implementing the project.

Disaster relief

In response to natural disasters and humanitarian crises, GlobalGiving regularly launches relief funds to support nonprofits helping those in need. The Disaster Recovery Network at GlobalGiving deploys a "model of effective, community-led relief and recovery through locally focused grants, advocacy, and training programs." GlobalGiving's former Chief Program Officer describes the approach as:

GlobalGiving's community of nonprofits, donors, and companies has funded relief work in response to a wide range of disasters, including  Hurricane Maria in 2017, the Nepal earthquake in 2015, the Ebola outbreak in West Africa in 2014, Typhoon Haiyan in 2013, the Tohoku earthquake and tsunami in 2011, and the ongoing Syrian refugee crisis, among others. GlobalGiving is regularly recommended by USAID's Center for International Disaster Information to donors looking to support disaster relief efforts.

Vetting
GlobalGiving runs a vetting program for nonprofits participating in its community. Nonprofits are judged on characteristics such as transparency, accountability, financials, and compliance with local regulations and international philanthropic guidelines. The vetting also factors in GlobalGiving-specific criteria such as engagement with the GlobalGiving community, ability to crowdfund on the platform, and ability to manage the programs fundraising on the platform.

Reviews
GlobalGiving earned Charity Navigator's highest rating of four stars in the latest ratings published by the charity evaluator. The Better Business Bureau's 2019 review states that GlobalGiving meets all of its charity accreditation standards.

References

External links
 Official website

Development charities based in the United States
Peer-to-peer charities
Crowdfunding platforms of the United States
American fundraising websites
Non-profit organizations listed in Russia as foreign agents